Elena Reiche (born 26 September 1979) is a German modern pentathlete. She represented Germany at the 2000 Summer Olympics held in Sydney, Australia in the women's modern pentathlon and she finished in 21st place.

References

External links 
 

1979 births
Living people
German female modern pentathletes
Olympic modern pentathletes of Germany
Modern pentathletes at the 2000 Summer Olympics
20th-century German women
21st-century German women